Africa Is a Woman's Name is a 2009 documentary film by Kenyan film producer Wanjiru Kinyanjui. The film was shot by Transparent Productions and the Zimmedia production company and distributed by Women Make Movies (WMM). It was directed by Kinjanjui, Ingrid Sinclair and Bridget Pickering. It lasts a total of 88 minutes.

Synopsis
The film stars three women, each of which tells their life stories: Amai Rose from Zimbabwe is a businesswoman and housewife, Phuti Ragophala is a South African school teacher and principal, and Njoki Ndung’u from Kenya is a politician, a member of Kenya's parliament and a human rights attorney and supporter. The three women express their opinions about what women and children in African cultures need to succeed. The film is said to portray a women's revolution on the Africa of the era (the late 2000s and early 2010s).

External links

2009 films
2009 documentary films
Kenyan documentary films